A Stranger in Town is a 1943 comedy-drama political film made by Metro-Goldwyn-Mayer. It was directed by Roy Rowland and produced by Robert Sisk from an original screenplay by Isobel Lennart and William Kozlenko. The film has a music score by Daniele Amfitheatrof and Nathaniel Shilkret, and cinematography by Sidney Wagner.

Plot
Quietly planning to go duck hunting, John Josephus (Joe) Grant, a U.S. Supreme Court justice, tells his secretary Lucy Gilbert where he will be but no one else. A fish-and-game warden promptly insists he pay an extra fee for a license and toss in a "tip". Grant refuses and ends up in town, facing possible criminal charges.

There he discovers honest lawyer Bill Adams, running for mayor against the incumbent, Connison, someone he considers to be corrupt. Judge Austin Harkley, businessman Blaxton and even the sheriff appear to be in the mayor's pocket, and when Bill is insulted and throws a punch, they conspire to keep him in jail.

Joe intervenes on Bill's behalf without telling anyone his true identity. He helps free Bill in the first legal dispute, then does likewise for Lucy after she shows up and is denied a room at the local hotel for no good reason. Joe ultimately admits who he really is, causing Bill to faint. Once he recovers, his political career begins.

Cast 
Frank Morgan as John Josephus Grant
Richard Carlson as Bill Adams
Jean Rogers as Lucy Gilbert
Porter Hall as Judge Austin Harkley
Robert Barrat as Mayor Connison
Donald MacBride as Vinnie Z. Blaxton
Walter Baldwin as Tom Cooney
Andrew Tombes as Roscoe Swade 
Olin Howland as Homer Todds
Chill Wills as Charles Craig
Irving Bacon as Orrin Todds
Eddie Dunn as Henry
Gladys Blake as Birdie
John Hodiak as Hart Ridges
Edward Keane as Blaxton's Lawyer
Robert Homans as Sergeant

References

External links 

1943 films
American black-and-white films
1940s political comedy-drama films
American political comedy-drama films
Films directed by Roy Rowland
Metro-Goldwyn-Mayer films
Films scored by Daniele Amfitheatrof
Films scored by Nathaniel Shilkret
1943 comedy films
1943 drama films
1940s English-language films
1940s American films